Buddy Christ is a parody religious icon created by filmmaker Kevin Smith, which first appeared in Smith's 1999 film Dogma. 

In the film, Buddy is part of a campaign ("Catholicism Wow!") to renew the image of (and interest in) the Catholic Church. Viewing the crucifix image as "wholly depressing", the Church of 1869, led by Cardinal Glick (George Carlin), decides to retire it, and creates Buddy Christ as a more uplifting image of Jesus Christ. The icon consists of a statue of Jesus, smiling and winking while pointing at onlookers with one hand and giving the thumbs-up sign with the other hand.  Buddy Christ was later produced as an action figure and a bobblehead. The image has since been turned into a popular Internet meme.

Appearances 
In addition to its unveiling in the film Dogma, Buddy Christ appears several other times in the View Askewniverse.

 A nun (Carrie Fisher) who picks up a hitchhiking Jay and Silent Bob in Jay and Silent Bob Strike Back has a Buddy Christ statue on her car dashboard.
 In the animated short Clerks: The Lost Scene, the "death cards" that Randal flicks through have numerous images that resemble Buddy Christ, as well as the angels from Dogma, Bartleby and Loki.
 In the film Clerks II, Jay wears a "Got Christ?" tank top with Buddy Christ's image.
 Mooby the Golden Calf, a false god or idol in Dogma, is often seen in the same pose as Buddy Christ. It is most notably featured at Mooby fast food restaurants (in Dogma, Jay and Silent Bob Strike Back, and Clerks II).
 In Clerks III, Elias and Blockchain create NFT kites with an image of the Buddy Christ emblazoned on the front.

Real-life appearances 
Buddy Christ was featured in a Phones4U advert, where a cartoon graphic depicting him was featured alongside a range of Android phones with the message "Miraculous deals on Samsung Galaxy Android phones". The United Kingdom Advertising Standards Authority later issued a rebuke regarding the advert, saying "We considered that, although the ads were intended to be light-hearted and humorous, their depiction of Jesus winking and holding a thumbs-up sign, with the text "miraculous" deals during Easter, the Christian Holy Week which celebrated Christ's resurrection, gave the impression that they were mocking and belittling core Christian beliefs."

The prop was used as a decoration in Smith's Red Bank, New Jersey, comics shop, Jay and Silent Bob's Secret Stash.

See also
 Cultural depictions of Jesus
 List of statues of Jesus

References

Portrayals of Jesus in film
View Askewniverse
Religious parodies and satires